Paul Ben Arredondo is an American former Republican politician. He changed his party affiliation to Democrat and served in the Arizona House of Representatives from 2011 to 2012.

He resigned in 2012 after he was indicted by the U.S. Department of Justice on charges of bribery, fraud, attempted extortion and making false statements from the time he served on the Tempe City Council and promoted a real estate deal using city lands.

Unexpectedly, during the investigation he admitted to mail fraud for his handling of the Arredondo Scholarship Fund, in which he solicited funds for 'average kids', but in fact much of the money went to his own relatives. In a plea deal on both charges, he was sentenced to 18 months of house arrest, plus probation.

References

1940s births
Living people
Democratic Party members of the Arizona House of Representatives
Date of birth missing (living people)
Arizona politicians convicted of crimes